Junction City School District 75  is a school district based in Junction City, Arkansas, United States. JCSD supports more than 525 students in prekindergarten through grade 12 and employs more than 105 educators and staff for its two schools and district offices. The district encompasses  in Union County, Arkansas and supports Junction City and portions of El Dorado.

Schools 
 Junction City High School, serving students in grades 7 through 12.
 Junction City Elementary School, serving students in prekindergarten through grade 6.

References

External links
 

Education in Union County, Arkansas
School districts in Arkansas